Birhane Dibaba (born 11 September 1993) is an Ethiopian long-distance runner who competes in road running events.

Biography
At the 2014 Tokyo Marathon, Birhane Dibaba ran a personal best time of 2:22:30 hours for second place, behind Ethipion teammate Tirfi Tsegaye. At the 2015 Tokyo Marathon, Birhane ran a time of 2:23:15 hours for first place. As a result of this marathon win, she was selected for the Ethiopian women's marathon team along with three other 2015 women's marathon winners at the 2015 World Championships in Athletics.

She competed in the women's marathon at the 2017 World Championships in Athletics.

References

External links

1993 births
Living people
Ethiopian female long-distance runners
Tokyo Marathon female winners
Ethiopian female marathon runners
World Athletics Championships athletes for Ethiopia
Athletes (track and field) at the 2020 Summer Olympics
Olympic athletes of Ethiopia
20th-century Ethiopian women
21st-century Ethiopian women